Ulysses "Joe" "Buster" Brown (1920 – September 7, 1942) was an American baseball catcher in the Negro leagues. He played from 1937 to 1942 with the Newark Eagles, Chicago American Giants, and the Cincinnati Clowns. Brown died in a car accident on September 7, 1942. Smoky Owens also died, while Eugene Bremmer, Herman Watts, Alonzo Boone, and Wilbur Hayes were also injured.

References

External links
 and Seamheads

1920 births
1942 deaths
Road incident deaths in Ohio
Newark Eagles players
Chicago American Giants players
20th-century African-American sportspeople
Baseball catchers